The following is a timeline of numerical analysis after 1945, and deals with developments after the invention of the modern electronic computer, which  began during Second World War. For a fuller history of the subject before this period, see timeline and history of mathematics.

1940s
 Monte Carlo simulation (voted one of the top 10 algorithms of the 20th century) invented at Los Alamos by von Neumann, Ulam and Metropolis.
 Crank–Nicolson method  was developed by Crank and Nicolson.
 Dantzig introduces the simplex method (voted one of the top 10 algorithms of the 20th century) in 1947.
 Turing formulated the LU decomposition method.

1950s
 Successive over-relaxation was devised simultaneously by D.M. Young, Jr. and by H. Frankel in 1950. 
 Hestenes, Stiefel, and Lanczos, all from the Institute for Numerical Analysis at the National Bureau of Standards, initiate the development of Krylov subspace iteration methods. Voted one of the top 10 algorithms of the 20th century.
 Equations of State Calculations by Fast Computing Machines introduces the Metropolis–Hastings algorithm.
 In numerical differential equations, Lax and Friedrichs invent the Lax-Friedrichs method.
 Householder invents his eponymous matrices and transformation method (voted one of the top 10 algorithms of the 20th century).
Romberg integration
 John G.F. Francis and Vera Kublanovskaya invent QR factorization (voted one of the top 10 algorithms of the 20th century).

1960s
 First recorded use of the term "finite element method" by Ray Clough, to describe the methods of Courant, Hrenikoff, Galerkin and Zienkiewicz, among others. See also here.
Exponential integration by Certaine and Pope.
 In computational fluid dynamics and numerical differential equations, Lax and Wendroff invent the Lax-Wendroff method.
 Fast Fourier Transform (voted one of the top 10 algorithms of the 20th century) invented by Cooley and Tukey.
 First edition of Handbook of Mathematical Functions by Abramowitz and Stegun, both of the U.S.National Bureau of Standards.
 Broyden does new quasi-Newton method for finding roots in 1965.
 The MacCormack method, for the numerical solution of hyperbolic partial differential equations in computational fluid dynamics, is introduced by  MacCormack in 1969.
 Verlet (re)discovers a numerical integration algorithm, (first used in 1791 by Delambre, by Cowell and Crommelin in 1909, and by Carl Fredrik Störmer in 1907, hence the alternative names Störmer's method or the Verlet-Störmer method) for dynamics.

1970s
Creation of LINPACK and associated benchmark by Dongarra et al., as well as BLAS.

1980s
 Progress in digital wavelet theory throughout  the decade, led by Daubechies et al.
Creation of MINPACK 
 Fast multipole method (voted one of the top 10 algorithms of the 20th century) invented by Rokhlin and Greengard.
 First edition of Numerical Recipes  by  Press, Teukolsky, et al.
 In numerical linear algebra, the GMRES algorithm invented in 1986.

See also
 Scientific computing
 History of numerical solution of differential equations using computers
 Numerical analysis
 Timeline of computational mathematics

References

Further reading

External links
 The History of Numerical Analysis and Scientific Computing @ SIAM (Society for Industrial and Applied Mathematics)
 
 The Monte Carlo Method: Classic Papers
 Monte Carlo Landmark Papers
 “Must read” papers in numerical analysis. Discussion at MathOverflow based upon a selected reading list on Lloyd N. Trefethen's personal site.

nume
Numerical analysis